Do It is the debut album by Lithuanian singer GJan, released on October 18, 2017, by Global Records.

Track listing
Track listing adapted from Amazon.com.

References

2017 debut albums